Ebbets Field Flannels, Inc is an American vintage athletic apparel manufacturer. The company was established in 1988 and is headquartered in Seattle, Washington. The company is known for its reproduction of historical baseball caps and wool flannel jerseys, primarily those of defunct minor league teams, teams from the Pacific Coast League, and Negro league teams. 

They also produce custom-made versions of their traditional athletic garments. One of the company's signature design elements is a green satin under-visor on their caps.

History

Ebbets Field Flannels was founded by Jerry Cohen in 1988, due to the limited availability of wool flannel baseball jerseys during that time period. The company's first run of caps were replicas of the Pacific Coast League's San Francisco Seals and Seattle Rainiers. The company ran their first advertisement in 1988, in an issue of Baseball America.

In November 2022, the company was acquired by Lids for an undisclosed amount.

Operations
Ebbets Field Flannels was commissioned by the producers of the 2013 film 42 to recreate the minor league and Negro league uniforms worn in the film. Teams included the Montreal Royals, Kansas City Monarchs, Birmingham Black Barons, Jersey City Giants, St. Paul Saints, and Indianapolis Indians. On July 16, 2015, the Negro Leagues Baseball Museum and Ebbets Field Flannels announced a new agreement to exclusively bear the "Authentic Black Diamond Collection" label.

References

External links
 Official website

Clothing companies established in 1988
Companies based in Seattle
Clothing companies of the United States